GlyphX Inc. was a computer graphics designer studio that has been producing promotional videos, cinematics and artwork for various video games for several years before going into video game design. The third-person shooter Advent Rising, the first and the latest video game created by GlyphX Games, LLC, the game designer branch of the company, had been long anticipated by critics and fans of the genre, but turned out to be rather a disappointment for both. However, the company intends to produce more games in the future.  GlyphX was acquired by Sandman Studios circa 2006.

Works

Illustrations
 Diablo II (2000, magazine article illustrations)
 Dinotopia Game Land Activity Center (2001, PC and GBA Box Covers)
 Drakan: Order of the Flame (1999, PC Box Cover)
 Gods & Heroes: Rome Rising (2005, E3 Banner)
 Hired Guns (1999, E3 Banner)
 Legacy of Kain: Soul Reaver (1999, PlayStation Box Cover)
 Legacy of Kain: Defiance (2003, Box Cover Art)
 Mortal Kombat: Deadly Alliance (2002, advertisement)
 One Must Fall: Battlegrounds (2003, PC Box Cover)
 Rally Fusion  (2002, PS2 Box Cover)
 Soul Reaver 2 (2001, magazine article illustrations, E3 Poster)
 Spider-Man (2000, PlayStation Box Cover)
 Spider-Man 2: Enter Electro (2001, PlayStation Box Cover)
 Star Trek: Voyager – Elite Force (2000, magazine article illustrations)
 Tenchu 2: Birth Of The Stealth Assassins (2000, independent artwork)
 Unreal II: The Awakening (2003, PC Box Cover, advertisement)
 Unreal Tournament 2003 (2002, PC Box Cover)
 Vigilante 8: Second Offense (1999, PlayStation Box Covers)

Games
 Advent Rising (2005)

References

External links
 Official Site

Video game companies of the United States
Video game development companies